Miranda Krestovnikoff (born 29 January 1973) is a British radio and television presenter specialising in natural history and archaeological programmes. She is an accomplished musician, and also a qualified scuba diver which has led to co-presenting opportunities in programmes with an underwater context.

Education
Krestovnikoff went to the Abbey School, Reading, Berkshire, before taking up a place at the University of Bristol to study zoology. Whilst at Bristol, she became interested in film-making of wildlife and the environment and gained work experience at the BBC's renowned Natural History Unit.

Natural history presenter
After graduating, Krestovnikoff worked her way up with the BBC and various Bristol-based wildlife production companies to a position of researcher. Her first presenting role was in the Fox Television programme World Gone Wild in 1999.

Since 2000, she has presented a number of programmes in the field of diving. Water Warriors was a Carlton children's production exploring the marine environment. Krestovnikoff then worked as a pet expert in the children's television show SMILE, and on the 2003–04 Channel 4 series Wreck Detectives. Continuing the history/archaeology theme, Krestovnikoff presented the BBC2 series Hidden Treasure. A major project in the summer of 2004 was the UKTV History/Anglia Television production Time Trail, which focused on local history in the East Anglian region.

Krestovnikoff was one of five presenters for the BBC2 series Coast, first broadcast in 2005, which brought her to greater public attention. The coast of Britain and its natural and human history were explored in detail, with Krestovnikoff presenting a natural history segment in each episode.  During summer 2005, Krestovnikoff filmed for a BBC2 and Open University production, entitled History Mysteries. She is a regular reporter for The One Show.

Krestovnikoff is also a passionate marine conservationist and presents for The Underwater Channel on the work of marine and wildlife charities, with other presenters such as Monty Halls.

Apart from her television work, Krestovnikoff has presented the breakfast programme on BBC Radio 3, writes articles for Diver magazine and engages in public speaking. She sometimes presents the Radio Four programme Tweet of the Day, such as on 11 June 2013, when she presented the programme about the Manx shearwater.

In addition, Krestovnikoff is also a talented musician, playing the flute in the New Bristol Sinfonia orchestra. In 1994, she formed her own a cappella choir, PARTSONG, which she directed for eight years.

Charity work
Krestovnikoff is a keen supporter of conservation charities and lists several on her personal website, including the Wildfowl & Wetlands Trust and Ape Action Africa. In October 2013 she was elected President of the Royal Society for the Protection of Birds, taking over from Kate Humble.

Personal life
She married Nicholas Krestovnikoff in 1998 and lives near Bristol with her son and daughter – and ten chickens.  She enjoys diving holidays, sailing, wild swimming, horse riding, camping, cycling and gardening.

References

External links
 
 

1973 births
Living people
Alumni of the University of Bristol
English radio presenters
English television presenters
English underwater divers
People educated at The Abbey School
People from Buckinghamshire